Ashraf Rabiei (1952 – 8 February 1982) was an Iranian guerrilla and member of the People's Mujahedin of Iran (MEK).

In 1975, she married Ali-Akbar Nabavi-Nuri, a fellow MEK member. Nabavi-Nuri was killed in action in 1976. She married Massoud Rajavi, leader of the MEK in summer 1980.

In 1980, she unsuccessfully ran for a seat in 1980 parliamentary election.

On 8 February 1982, the Islamic Revolutionary Guard Corps raided the safe house of Rabiei in northern Tehran and after three hours of gunshots, she was killed along with other MEK members including Mousa Khiabani and his wife Azar Rezaei, among others.

The MEK named Camp Ashraf after her.

Electoral history

References 

1952 births
1981 deaths
People's Mojahedin Organization of Iran members